Cricothyroid may refer to:

 Cricothyroid muscle
 Cricothyroid ligament